Kazan is a village in the Çukurca District in Hakkâri Province in Turkey. The village had a population of 25 in 2022.

The hamlets of Benekli and Yaprak are attached to Kazan. Benekli is unpopulated.

Population 
Population history of the village from 2007 to 2022:

References 

Kurdish settlements in Hakkâri Province
Villages in Çukurca District